Oliver Robert Ford Davies (born 12 August 1939) is an English actor and writer, best known for his extensive theatre work, and to a broader audience for his role as Sio Bibble in Star Wars Episodes I to III. He is also known for his role as Maester Cressen in HBO series Game of Thrones.

Early life and academic career
Davies was born in Ealing, Middlesex, England. He attended the King's School, Canterbury. In 1956 He joined the eminent Ealing amateur company Questors. He won a scholarship to Merton College, Oxford, where he read History and became President of the Oxford University Dramatic Society.  After obtaining his DPhil, he worked as a history lecturer at the University of Edinburgh before taking up acting professionally in 1967.

Acting career
In 1959, as a member of the Oxford University Experimental Theatre Club, he appeared in his first Stratford performance in the Memorial Theatre's open-air production of Bartholomew Fair. His first professional appearances were, at the age of 27, in the 1967 season at the Birmingham Repertory Theatre. Short Seasons at the Mermaid, London, the Oxford Playhouse and the Cambridge Arts Theatre followed. His long and prolific association with the Royal Shakespeare Company started in 1975, when director Terry Hands cast him as Mountjoy in Henry V. He is an Honorary Associate Artist of the company. From 1990 until 2019 He appeared more frequently at the National Theatre, London, until at the age of 80 he lent his "sublime presence" to the part of the appraising button moulder in Henryk Ibsen's Peter Gynt at the Olivier Theatre.

On television, Davies had a regular role as Peter Foxcott QC in Kavanagh QC and was schoolmaster Le Bas in the serialization of A Dance to the Music of Time (1997). He also appeared with John Thaw in an episode of Inspector Morse and also appeared in the ITV television drama The Uninvited, and in a 2002 episode of the popular drama Foyle's War.

On film, his most prominent role was probably Sio Bibble in the Star Wars prequel trilogy films, released in 1999, 2002 and 2005. In 2003, Davies appeared in the film Johnny English, where he portrayed the Archbishop of Canterbury.

He appeared on stage as Polonius in Hamlet with the Royal Shakespeare Company, alongside David Tennant and Patrick Stewart, and in 2009 appeared in All's Well That Ends Well at the Royal National Theatre as the King of France. In 2010, he appeared as Balfour in the premiere of Ben Brown's play The Promise, about the Balfour Declaration.

In 2011, he appeared in a stage adaptation of Michelle Magorian's book Goodnight Mister Tom, in which he played the central character, Thomas Oakley. He was back with the Royal Shakespeare Company in 2014 as Justice Shallow in Henry IV, Part 2. Davies again appeared with David Tennant in Richard II in 2013. In February 2019 Davies discussed his career in the BBC Radio Three series Private Passions.

Awards and nominations

Davies was awarded the Laurence Olivier Award in 1990 (1989 season) for Best Actor in a New Play for Racing Demon. He was twice nominated for a Laurence Olivier Theatre Award for Best Performance in a Supporting Role for his performance in Absolutely! (perhaps) at the Wyndham's Theatre in 2003, and again in 2009 for his performance as Polonius in the RSC production of Hamlet at the Novello Theatre.

Books

Davies's books include Playing Lear, an account of his experience while performing King Lear at the Almeida Theatre, and Performing Shakespeare. Both are published by Nick Hern Books.

Playwright
Davies's drama King Cromwell was staged at the Orange Tree Theatre, Richmond, in November 2003. The director was Sam Walters and Davies himself took the title role.

Partial filmography
Defence of the Realm (1986) – Anthony Clegg
Scandal (1989) – Mr. Woods, MI5
Paper Mask (1990) – Coroner
Sense and Sensibility (1995) – Doctor Harris
Mrs Brown (1997) – Dean of Windsor
Mrs Dalloway (1997) – Hugh Whitbread
Titanic Town (1998) – Whittington
An Ideal Husband (1999) – Sir Hugo Danforth
Star Wars: Episode I – The Phantom Menace (1999) – Sio Bibble
Blow Dry (2001) – Doctor Hamilton
Just Visiting (2001) – Pit Rivers
Revelation (2001) – Professor Casaubon
Bertie and Elizabeth (2002) – Cosmo Gordon Lang
Star Wars: Episode II – Attack of the Clones (2002) – Sio Bibble
Johnny English (2003) – Archbishop of Canterbury
The Mother (2003) – Bruce
Gladiatress (2004) – (uncredited)
Star Wars: Episode III – Revenge of the Sith (2005) – Sio Bibble
Heidi (2005) – Dr. Classen
National Theatre Live: All's Well That Ends Well (2009) – King of France
The Deep Blue Sea (2011) – Hester's Father
Royal Shakespeare Company: Henry IV Part II (2014) – Shallow
The Last Witness (2018) – Sir Alexander Cadogan / Anthony Eden / Owen O'Malley (voice)
Christopher Robin (2018) – Old Man Winslow 
A Splinter of Ice (2021) - Graeme Greene
Triangle of Sadness (2022) - Winston

Partial TV series filmography
 The Protectors (1973) – Hansen, episode "Bagman"
 The Brontes of Haworth (1973) – John Hunter Thompson, "Home and Abroad"
 Father Brown (1974) – Det. Insp. Corliss, episode "The Eye of Apollo"
 A Taste of Death (1988 mini-series) – Father Francis Barnes, 6 episodes
 Inspector Morse (1991) – Frederick Redpath, episode "Second Time Around" (S05:E01)
 Maigret (1992 TV series) – Dr. Pardon, episode "Maigret on the Defensive" (S02:E03)
 Sense and Sensibility (1995) – Doctor Harris; Jane Austen adaptation
 A Dance to the Music of Time (1997) – Le Bas, "Post War", "The Twenties"
 Pie in the Sky (1997) – James Truman, MP, episode "Squashed Tomatoes" (S05:E01)
 Heartbeat (1999) - Henry Tomkinson, episode "Testament"
 Kavanagh QC (1999, 2001) – Peter Foxcott QC, Peter Foxcott, 26 episodes
 Agatha Christie's Poirot (2000) – Dr. James Sheppard, "The Murder of Roger Ackroyd"
 Midsomer Murders (2005 TV series) – Otto Benham, episode "Hidden Depths" (S08:E06)
 Waking the Dead (2007) – Hugo Keegan, "The Fall" Parts 1 & 2
 Game of Thrones (2012) – Maester Cressen, episode "The North Remembers" (S02:E01)
 Agatha Christie's Miss Marple (2013) – Major Palgrave, "A Caribbean Mystery"
 You, Me and the Apocalypse (2015) – Cardinal Crawshaw "24 Hours to Go", "Saviour Day"
 Catastrophe (2017) – Wallace, episode 3.3
 Father Brown (2018) – Bishop Golding, episode "The Two Deaths of Hercule Flambeau" (S06:E10)

References

External links

Nick Hern Books

1939 births
Living people
Alumni of Merton College, Oxford
English male film actors
English male stage actors
English male television actors
People educated at The King's School, Canterbury
Laurence Olivier Award winners
Royal Shakespeare Company members
English male Shakespearean actors
People from Ealing
Male actors from London